The Turkish Women's Football Super League, formerly the First Women's Football League (also known as the Turkcell Women's Football Super League for sponsorship reasons), is the top level women's football league of Turkey. In the 2022–23 season, one group of 10 teams and one group of nine teams play a double round robin and finals to decide a champion club, which qualifies for a spot in the UEFA Women's Champions League.

On 8 March 2021, the International Women's Day, the Turkish Football Federation signed a sponsorship agreement with the Turkish mobile phone operator Turkcell. Accordingly, the First Women's Football League was named Turkcell Women's Super League beginning with the 2021–22 season.

Format
In an effort to increase quality of the league, in the 2009–10 season two teams were relegated and four teams were promoted to the first league. Thus, the 2010–11 season consisted of twelve teams. Fashion One TV became the official media sponsor of the league for the 2010–11 season. At this time the league gained little attention in Turkey. After playing two groups with six teams and then having a championship and relegation group, the 2012–13 season was played as a double-round robin with ten teams again. The winner after 18 games was the champion and qualifies for the UEFA Women's Champions League, the bottom two teams get relegated. In 2016–17 there again was introduced a championship and relegation round after the regular season.

For the 2019-20 league season, the number of participating teams was increased from ten to twelve again after eight seasons. No relegation was planned to take place, so that the planned number of teams would be achieved with two promoted teams from the Women's Second League. However, Trabzon İdmanocağı had to be relegated since they did not show up in the entire previous season. To replace them, a third team from the Second League was promoted. All three women's leagues of the 2019-20 season were stopped on 8 March 2020 due to COVID-19 pandemic in Turkey.

Due to the ongoing pandemic, the 2020-21 season of the Women's First Football League, after renaming the Turkcell Women's Football League, will take start with delay on 17 April 2021. The season was dedicated to healthcare workers, and named 2021 Turkish Turkcell Women's Football League Healthcare Workers' Season. The league consisted of 16 teams, including all the 12 teams from the previous season and 4 teams promoted from the Second League's previous season. The teams were divided into four groups of four teams each, with one promoted team in each group. Each team in the group played only three matches in a round-robin tournament. The top two teams of the four groups play quarter-finals and semi-finals in Single-elimination tournament. The winner of the final match, on 4 May 2021, represented Turkey at the 2021–22 UEFA Women's Champions League.

Clubs

Past winners

Winners by team

League participation (since 2006)
Note: The tallies below include up to the 2022–23 season. Teams denoted in bold are current participants.

 17 seasons: Konak Belediyespor
 15 seasons: Ataşehir Belediyespor
 14 seasons: Adana İdman Yurdu, Karadeniz Ereğli Belediyespor
 10 seasons: Trabzon İdmanocağı
 8 seasons: Kireçburnu
 7 seasons: Beşiktaş
 6 seasons: 1207 Antalyaspor, Amed Sportif Faaliyetler, Fatih Vatanspor, FOMGET, Gazi Üniversitesi, İlkadım Belediyesi Yabancılar Pazarıspor, Trabzonspor
 5 seasons: ALG, Antalyaspor, Buca Geliştirmespor, Hakkarigücü, Marmara Üniversitesi, Mersin Camspor
 4 seasons: Kartalspor, Lüleburgaz 39spor, Maltepe Yalıspor
 3 seasons: Derincespor, Dudullu, Eskişehirspor, Kocaeli Bayan, Sakarya Yenikent Güneşspor
 2 seasons: Altay, Çamlıcaspor, Elitspor, Fatih Karagümrük, Fenerbahçe, Galatasaray, Gazikentspor, Hatayspor, Karşıyaka BESEMspor, Kayserispor, Malatya Gençlikspor, Mersin Gençlerbirliği, Mersingücü Cengiz Topelspor, Zeytinburnuspor
 1 seasons: Amasya Eğitimspor, Bursa Sağlıkgücü Gençlikspor, Çaykur Rizespor, Dostlukspor, Eskişehirspor Lisesispor, Gölcükspor, Hatay Dumlupınarspor, İzmit Belediyespor, İzmit Çenesuyu Plajyoluspor, Orduspor 1967, Sivasspor

Foreign players

Top goalscorers

See also
Women's football in Turkey
Turkish Women's Football First League
Turkish Women's Second Football League
Turkish Women's Third Football League
Turkish Women's Regional Football League
List of women's football clubs in Turkey
Turkish women in sports

References

External links

 Official Site  of the Turkish Football Federation
 Turkish league on women.soccerway.com

Turkish Women's Football Super League
Top level women's association football leagues in Europe
First
Sports leagues established in 1994
1993 establishments in Turkey
Football
Professional sports leagues in Turkey